Francofolies or Les Francofolies may refer to:

 Les FrancoFolies de Montréal, a music festival in Montréal, Québec, Canada
 Les Francofolies de La Rochelle, a music festival in La Rochelle, France
 Les Francofolies de Spa, a music festival in Spa, Belgium
 Les Francofolies de Kinshasa, a music festival in Kinshasa, Democratic Republic of the Congo